The Guaye were one of the Circassian tribes. They were destroyed after the Circassian genocide following the Russo-Circassian War, as not a single member survived.

Mentions 
In 1857, Leonty Yakovlevich Lyulie gave a description of them, which was the last known mention of them in history.

References 

Circassian tribes
History of Kuban
Adygea
Historical ethnic groups of Russia